is FIS certified ski jump hill Yamagata Zao Onsen Ski Resort, Yamagata, Japan. It is located in a location that is sandwiched Kami-no-dai slopes and Ryūzan slopes.

History
It was built to fit the Inter skiing Zaō tournament of 1979. Tournament of FIS certified than 1989 to 2011 (International Zao jump competitions NHK Trophy and international Zao jump tournament Yamagata Mayor's Cup) has been held. In March 2012 FIS Ski Jumping World Cup Ladies is held for the first time in Japan, has been organized each year two races later.

Events

Ladies

Footnotes

References

External links
 Yamagata hill profile (Japanese)

1979 establishments in Japan
Yamagata, Yamagata
Ski areas and resorts in Japan
Ski jumping venues in Japan
Sports venues in Yamagata Prefecture
Sports venues completed in 1979